The Royal Tank Museum (Arabic: متحف الدبابات الملكي) is a Tank museum in Amman, Jordan. Located next to the King Abdullah II Park in Al Muqabalain, the museum was established in 2007 upon King Abdullah's directives. The museum building was designed by Zaid Daoud Architects as a "futuristic sand castle that borrows from the language of Stealth." It has close to 20,000 sq. m of exhibition space divided into thirteen halls showcasing hundreds of light and heavy military items placed in their historic chronological order "for dramatic impact". Each hall presents a different perspective of machinery and scenery and features around 110 tanks, many of which are historical and were used in Jordan's past wars and battles.

The museum was opened on January 29, 2018, in a ceremony led by His Majesty King Abdullah II of Jordan.

See also
Bundeswehr Museum of German Defense Technology – Koblenz, Germany
Deutsches Panzermuseum – Munster, Germany
Australian Armour and Artillery Museum – Australia
Musée des Blindés – Paris, France
Nationaal Militair Museum – Soesterberg, The Netherlands
The Tank Museum – Bovington, United Kingdom
United States Army Ordnance Museum
Polish Army Museum – Warsaw, Poland

References

External links
 
 Official website

2018 establishments in Jordan
Museums established in 2018
Museums in Amman
Army museums in Asia
Tank museums
World War II museums in Jordan